Lipid phosphate phosphohydrolase 2 is an enzyme that in humans is encoded by the PPAP2C gene.

The protein encoded by this gene is a member of the phosphatidic acid phosphatase (PAP) family. PAPs convert phosphatidic acid to diacylglycerol, and function in de novo synthesis of glycerolipids as well as in receptor-activated signal transduction mediated by phospholipase D. This protein is similar to phosphatidic acid phosphatase type 2A (PPAP2A) and type 2B (PPAP2B). All three proteins contain 6 transmembrane regions, and a consensus N-glycosylation site. This protein has been shown to possess membrane associated PAP activity. Three alternatively spliced transcript variants encoding distinct isoforms have been reported.

References

Further reading